Jasmin Moallem (born April 15, 1995) is an Israeli singer, songwriter, rapper and record producer.

Early life
Moallem was born in Jerusalem, Israel to a family of Mizrahi Jewish descent. She lived in Portugal from age two to age four. After her military service in the Israel Defense Forces in 2015, she studied at music schools in London, England and the United States, and then at the Rimon School of Jazz and Contemporary Music in Israel. In 2018, she competed in Rimon's competition, called  "Shirimon," performing "Noetzet Mabat" by Omer Adam. She used a looper while performing and won the first place.

Career
In 2020, she released her debut album, called Arye, through Yahalom Records. The album included the lead single "Mesiba," featuring Israeli rapper Shekel, which became a hit and reached the top of streaming charts in Israel and entered Israeli radio station Galgalatz's playlist.

Discography

Studio album

References 

Israeli pop singers
Israeli women singer-songwriters
Jewish Israeli musicians
Israeli women rappers
Israeli hip hop musicians
Israeli record producers
Contemporary R&B singers
Bedroom pop musicians
1995 births
Living people
Israeli Mizrahi Jews
21st-century Israeli women singers